The Flames of the End is a three-disc DVD set from Swedish metal band At the Gates. Its main feature is a 2-hour+ documentary detailing the history of the band and their successful reunion tour, directed by guitarist and founding member Anders Bjorler. The set also includes their set from Wacken Open Air 2008 on the second disc, and a collection of songs from various venues, music videos and deleted scenes from the documentary on the third. The set is packaged in a digipak with a 40-page booklet. Earache Records has also made available a limited-edition set including an LP, CD, shirt, belt buckle, keyring, patch and 4 plectrums. Bjorler has described the DVD as "a fine last document for the band".

Disc one: "Under a Serpent Sun - The Story of At the Gates"
 Introduction & Opening Titles 
 Reunion: From Vision to Reality
 The Early Years Part 1: From Nursery Rhymes to Death Metal
 The Early Years Part 2: The Schillerska / Billdal Connection
 The Early Years Part 3: The Grotesque / At the Gates Transition
 The Early Years Part 4: Creativity Unbound
 Gardens of Grief
 The Red in the Sky Is Ours
 Reunion: Sweden Rock 2008
 With Fear I Kiss the Burning Darkness
 Exit Alf - Enter Martin
 Reunion: Graspop 2008
 Terminal Spirit Disease
 Reunion: Ruis Rock 2008
 Slaughter of the Soul
 Reunion: America re-visited
 Reunion: San Antonio, TX 2008
 Exit Anders
 Reunion: Bloodstock Open Air 2008
 Reunion: The Past Is Alive
 Beyond the Gates
 End Credits
 Interview with Tomas in Chicago 1996 (Deleted Scenes)
 Adrian, the Prankster (Deleted Scenes)
 The Tokyo Experience (Deleted Scenes)
 Elvis Has Left the Building (Deleted Scenes)
 European Mini-Tour with Therion 1992 (Deleted Scenes)
 Gods of Metal, Italy 2008 (Deleted Scenes)
 Tompa cleaning out the trailer (Deleted Scenes)
 Kingdom Gone (Music Video)
 The Burning Darkness (Music Video)
 Terminal Spirit Disease (Music Video)
 Blinded by Fear (Music Video)

Disc two: "Purgatory Unleashed - Live at Wacken"
 Intro (backstage)
 Slaughter of the Soul
 Cold
 Terminal Spirit Disease
 Raped by the Light of Christ
 Under a Serpent Sun
 Windows
 World of Lies
 The Burning Darkness
 The Swarm
 Forever Blind
 Nausea
 The Beautiful Wound
 Unto Others
 All Life Ends
 Need
 Blinded by Fear
 Suicide Nation
 Kingdom Gone

Disc three: "Only the Dead Are Smiling"
 Slaughter of the Soul (Wetlands, New York, US 7 March 1996)
 Cold (Wetlands, New York, US 7 March 1996)
 The Swarm (Wetlands, New York, US 7 March 1996)
 Blinded by Fear (Thirsty Whale, Rivergrove, IL, US, 10 March 1996)
 Suicide Nation (Thirsty Whale, Rivergrove, IL, US, 10 March 1996)
 Under a Serpent Sun (Thirsty Whale, Rivergrove, IL, US, 10 March 1996)
 Suicide Nation (Ruisrock, Turku, Finland, 4 July 2008)
 Raped by the Light of Christ (Ruisrock, Turku, Finland, 4 July 2008)
 Windows (Ruisrock, Turku, Finland, 4 July 2008)
 World of Lies (Ruisrock, Turku, Finland, 4 July 2008)
 Nausea (Ruisrock, Turku, Finland, 4 July 2008)
 Slaughter of the Soul (Graspop Metal Meeting, Dessel, Belgium, 29 June 2008)
 Cold (Graspop Metal Meeting, Dessel, Belgium, 29 June 2008)
 Terminal Spirit Disease (Graspop Metal Meeting, Dessel, Belgium, 29 June 2008)
 The Beautiful Wound (Graspop Metal Meeting, Dessel, Belgium, 29 June 2008)
 The Burning Darkness (Witchwood, Manchester UK, 5 February 1996)
 Through Gardens of Grief (Factory, Eskilstuna, Sweden, 20 April 1991)
 All Life Ends (Factory, Eskilstuna, Sweden, 20 April 1991)
 City of Screaming Statues (Factory, Eskilstuna, Sweden, 20 April 1991)
 Slaughter of the Soul (Studio Coast, Tokyo, Japan, 11 May 2008)
 Cold (Studio Coast, Tokyo, Japan, 11 May 2008)
 Under a Serpent Sun (Studio Coast, Tokyo, Japan, 11 May 2008)
 Slaughter of the Soul (Irving Plaza, New York, US, 9 July 2008)
 Need (The Abyss, Houston, TX, US, 17 March 1996)
 Neverwhere (Gagarin 205, Athens, Greece, 21 September 2008)
 Kingdom Gone (Gagarin 205, Athens, Greece, 21 September 2008)

Personnel

Reunion tour line-up
 Tomas Lindberg − vocals
 Anders Björler − guitar
 Martin Larsson - guitar
 Jonas Björler − bass
 Adrian Erlandsson − drums

Former members (archive footage)
 Alf Svensson − guitar (1990–1993)
 Tony Andersson − bass (1992)
"Purgatory Unleashed" produced by  Tue Madsen

References

External links
Official website

At the Gates albums
2010 video albums
2010 live albums
Live video albums
Earache Records video albums
Earache Records live albums